Glen(n) Williams may refer to:

Glen Morgan Williams (1920–2012), United States federal judge
Glen Williams (basketball) (1954–2017), American basketball player
Glen Williams, Ontario, a hamlet in Ontario, Canada
Glenn Williams (born 1977), baseball player from Australia
Glenn Williams (sound engineer), American sound engineer

See also